The Ombudsman against Discrimination on Grounds of Sexual Orientation, abbreviated HomO, was the Swedish office of the ombudsman against discrimination on grounds of sexual orientation. On 1 January 2009, it was merged with other ombudsman officers into the new Equality Ombudsman (Diskrimineringsombudsmannen).

HomO was the most recently instituted Swedish ombudsman, in the sense of a government official who addresses the complaints of individual citizens. HomO had the status of a government agency. In 2005 it received around 8 million SEK in government funding.

The term HomO is used both to refer to the office and as the title of its government-appointed acting head. HomO was the officially mandated short form, but is not a true acronym or abbreviation. Instead the word alludes to both "homo" (homosexual) and to traditional Swedish ombudsman abbreviations which do expand into descriptive terms, such as JämO = .

In addition to this government office, the merger that created the Equality Ombudsman office involved the earlier offices of Equality Ombudsman, Ombudsman against Ethnic Discrimination and Disability Ombudsman.

See also

LGBT rights in Sweden
List of LGBT rights organisations
Swedish Federation for Lesbian, Gay, Bisexual and Transgender Rights, RFSL

External links
 Official site for HomO (English)

LGBT political advocacy groups in Sweden
Ombudsman against Discrimination on Grounds of Sexual Orientation
 Sexual Orientation Discrimination